Saymon Zakaria (born 3 December 1972) is a Bangladeshi folk researcher and Deputy Director of the Department of Culture in the  Bangla Academy. He was awarded Bangla Academy Literary Award in 2020 for his contribution in Bangladeshi folklore.

Early life
Zakaria was born on 3 December 1972 at the Jungli village under Kumarkhali Upazila of Kushtia District in Bangladesh. He received a Master of Philosophy on "The Characters of Rama and Sita in the Popular Versions of the Ramayana in Bangladesh" from the Jahangirnagar University and obtained Doctor of Philosophy on the "Traditional Theater in Bangladesh: Content and Mode of Language" from the University of Dhaka.

Career 
Zakaria joined the Bangla Academy's folklore department as a manuscript editor. He was the research assistant of the cultural survey project at the Asiatic Society of Bangladesh, research lead of the UNESCO's Action Plan for the Safeguarding of Baul Songs project run by the Bangladesh Shilpakala Academy and the sub-editor of the daily Samakal.

Major publications
Some of his notable publication includes:

Bibliography

 Prachin Banglar Buddho Natok, 2008
 Bangladesher Lokonatok: Bisoy o Angik-Boychittra, 2008
 Abaṇāgabaṇa: samakālīna Bāṃlā bhāṣāya prācīna caryāpadera rūpāntarita gītabāṇī, 2010
 Banga sahityer alikhita Itihas (co-editor), 2010
 Pronomohi Bongomata: Indigenous Cultural Forms of Bangladesh, 2011
 Folklore o Likhito Sahitya : Jaarigaaner Asore ‘Bishad-Sindhu’ Attikoron o Poribeshon Poddhoti (co-editor), 2012
 Bangladesher Oitijjobahi Badyajantro (co-editor), 2013
 Bangladesher Lokosogeet, 2014
 Selim Al Din Racanasamagra (complete literary works of Selim Al-Din), 8 vols, 2005-2013
 Baulsangeet (co-editor), 2013
 City of Mirrors: Songs of Lālan Sā̃i, 2017

Others

 Suru kari bhumir name (drama), 1996
 Ke Tahare Cinte Pare (novel), 2009
 Sadanonder sansare (a collection of poems), 2009
 Natoksangroho vol. 1 & 2 (a collection of play), 2010
 Anandamoyer Agomone (a collection of poems), 2011
 Uttarlaloncarita, 2014
 Bodhidrum : Ekti Buddha Natak, 2014
 Rabindranath: Janamanusher Kachhe
 Pronomohi Bongomata, 2004-2017
 Doyaal Tomar Asol Namta ki, 2017
 Kulhara Kalongkini, 2017

Awards
 Madhusudan Academy awards (2018)
 Kāli o Kalama-HSBC young writers award (2008) 
 Protham Alo Best Book of the Year 1415 (2009) 
 Bangla Academy Literary Award (2019)

References

1972 births
Living people
People from Kushtia District
Jahangirnagar University alumni
University of Dhaka alumni
Bangladeshi folklorists
Bangladeshi male writers
Recipients of Bangla Academy Award